Escale À Ch'tiland is a Live album by the French progressive rock band Ange. It was released in 2011.

Track listing
Disc One:
"Ces Gens-Là"  – 05:50
"Le Cimetière Des Arlequins"  – 08:25
"Les Yeux D'un Fou"  – 04:16
"Le Rêve Est À Rêver [2ème Service]"  – 06:20
"Le Marchand De Planètes"  – 07:33
"Sur La Trace Des Fées"  – 06:00
"Les Eaux Du Gange"  – 05:23
"Neuf Heures"  – 05:23
"Les Collines Roses"  – 04:00
"Le Vieux De La Montagne"  – 08:10
"Couleurs En Colère"  – 07:20
Disc Two:
"Les Enfants Du Hasard"  – 06:30
"Capitaine Cœur De Miel"  – 19:10
"Hors-La-Loi"  – 05:20
"L'œil Et L'ouïe"  – 07:07
"Hymne À La Vie"  – 12:47
"Cantique" 
"Procession" 
"Hymne" 
"Shéhérazade"  – 04:55
DVD:
"Ces Gens-Là"  – 05:50
"Le Cimetière Des Arlequins"  – 08:25
"Les Yeux D'un Fou"  – 04:16
"Le Rêve Est À Rêver [2ème Service]"  – 06:20
"Le Marchand De Planètes"  – 07:33
"Sur La Trace Des Fées"  – 06:00
"Les Eaux Du Gange"  – 05:23
"Neuf Heures"  – 05:23
"Fou" 
"Le Vieux De La Montagne"  – 08:10
"Couleurs En Colère"  – 07:20
"Les Enfants Du Hasard"  – 06:30
"Capitaine Cœur De Miel"  – 19:10
"Hors-La-Loi"  – 05:20
"L'œil Et L'ouïe"  – 07:07
"Hymne À La Vie"  – 12:47
"Cantique" 
"Procession" 
"Hymne" 
"Shéhérazade"  – 04:55
"Le Ballon De Billy" 
"Ode À Émile" 
Bonus:
"Le Pied En Coulisses [Documentaire]"

Personnel
 Lead Vocals, Keyboards, Guitar, Percussions: Christian Decamps
 Vocals, Percussions, Backing Vocals: Caroline Crozat
 Keyboards, Backing Vocals, Programming, Backing Vocals: Tristan Decamps
 Guitars, Backing Vocals: Hassan Hajdi
 Bass, Backing Vocals, Backing Vocals: Thierry Sidhoum
 Drums, Percussion: Benoit Cazzulini

References
Escale À Ch'tiland on ange-updlm 
Escale À Ch'tiland on www.amarokprog.net

Ange albums
2011 live albums